In sociology and anthropology, time discipline is the general name given to social and economic rules, conventions, customs, and expectations governing the measurement of time, the social currency and awareness of time measurements, and people's expectations concerning the observance of these customs by others.

The concept of "time discipline" as a field of special attention in sociology and anthropology was pioneered by E. P. Thompson in Time, Work-Discipline, and Industrial Capitalism, published in 1967.  Coming from a Marxist viewpoint, Thompson argued that observance of clock-time is a consequence of the European industrial revolution, and that neither industrial capitalism nor the creation of the modern state would have been possible without the imposition of synchronic forms of time and work discipline. The new clock time imposed by government and capitalist interests replaced earlier, collective perceptions of time that Thompson believed flowed from the collective wisdom of human societies.  While in fact it appears likely that earlier views of time were imposed instead by religious and other social authorities prior to the industrial revolution, Thompson's work identified time discipline as an important concept for study within the social sciences.

Other views of time discipline
While Thompson's theory of industrial time-discipline has dominated the field for more than 40 years, critics of his work have emerged.

Paul Glennie and Nigel Thrift posit an alternative perspective on the development of time-consciousness in "Reworking E. P. Thompson's 'Time, Work-Discipline and Industrial Capitalism'" (1996). According to Glennie and Thrift, Thompson and subsequent theorists on modern time competence in England have theorized that industrial work-discipline centered on the clock is responsible for spreading a unitary concept of time rooted in materialist realities. In contrast, Glennie and Thrift explore the role of symbolic, qualitative, and multiple time-senses in the West. Different kinds of work and multiple means of measuring time problematize the centrality of factory work and the clock. Generally, they argue that time-discipline was evident before the spread of industrialization and that it did not trigger a significant change in time-sense. Because it rests on the argument that disparate, spatial temporalities can not be unified, critics have argued that their analysis seems incomplete. In short, they offer poignant critiques of the dominant theory without positing a stronger theory in its place.

Michael J. Sauter argues that Thompson's approach to time discipline is "gendered and Eurocentric". Time discipline did not arise because of the Industrial Revolution, but had been a phenomenon since the Middle Ages as the government, religion, and economics played larger roles in day-to-day life. In Sauter's article "Clockwatchers and Stargazers: Time Discipline in Early Modern Berlin", he argues that time discipline came from the streets, and was part of the rise of "local knowledge" as public clocks were used by public event planners. People began to learn where clocks were located and which social groups used which ones. Furthermore, Sauter argues that time discipline is not "externally imposed" on people, but "a standard that is determined by people with specialized knowledge and skills". Prior to the rise of mechanical timekeeping, clocks were based on the easily accessed sun, and after 1800 precise timekeeping again returned to the Earth's position in relationship to the stars, as measured by scientists using specialized instruments.

The natural world
In societies based around agriculture, hunting, and other pursuits that involve human interaction with the natural world, time discipline is a matter governed by astronomical and biological factors.  Specific times of day or seasons of the year are defined by reference to these factors, and measured, to the extent that they need measuring, by observation.  Different peoples' needs with respect to these things mean sharply differing cultural perceptions of time.  For example, it surprises many non-Muslims that the Islamic calendar is entirely lunar and makes no reference at all to the seasons; the desert-dwelling Arabs who devised it were nomads rather than agriculturalists, and a calendar that made no reference to the seasons was no inconvenience for most of them.

In Western societies
In more urban societies, some of these natural phenomena were no longer at hand, and most were of much less consequence to the inhabitants.  Artificial means of dividing and measuring time were needed.  Plautus complained of the social effect of the invention of such divisions in his lines complaining of the sundial:

The gods confound the man who first found outHow to distinguish hours! Confound him, too,Who in this place set up a sun-dial,To cut and hack my days so wretchedlyInto small portions. When I was a boyMy belly was my sun-dial; one more sure,Truer, and more exact than any of them.This dial told me when 'twas proper timeTo go to dinner, when I had aught to eat.But now-a-days, why, even when I have,I can't fall-to, unless the sun give leave.The town's so full of these confounded dials,The greatest part of its inhabitants,Shrunk up with hunger, creep along the streets.

Plautus's protagonist here complains about the social discipline and expectations that arose when these measurements of time were introduced.  The invention of artificial units of time measurement made the introduction of time management possible, and time management was not universally appreciated by those whose time was managed.

Western religious influences
In western Europe, the practice of Christian monasticism introduced new factors into the time discipline observed by members of religious communities.  The rule of Saint Benedict introduced canonical hours; these were religious observances that were held on a daily basis, and based on factors again mostly unrelated to natural phenomena.  It is no surprise, then, that religious communities were likely the inventors, and certainly the major consumers, of early clocks.  The invention of the mechanical clock in western Europe, and its subsequent technical developments, enabled a public time discipline even less related to natural phenomena.  (Highly sophisticated clepsydras existed in China, where they were used by astrologers connected with the imperial court; these water clocks were quite large, and their use limited to those who were professionally interested in precise timekeeping.)

The invention of the clock
The English word clock comes from an Old French word for "bell," for the striking feature of early clocks was a greater concern than their dials.  Shakespeare's Sonnet XII begins, "When I do count the clock that tells the time."  Even after the introduction of the clock face, clocks were costly, and found mostly in the homes of aristocrats.  The vast majority of urban dwellers had to rely on clock towers, and outside the sight of their dials or the sound of their bells, clock time held no sway.  Clock towers did define the time of day, at least for those who could hear and see them.  As the saying goes, "a person with a clock always knows what time it is; a person with two clocks is never sure."

Improvements of the clock
The discipline imposed by these public clocks still remained lax by contemporary standards.  A clock that only strikes the hours can only record the nearest hour that has passed; most early clocks had only hour hands in any case.  Minute hands did not come into widespread use until the pendulum enabled a large leap in the accuracy of clocks; for watches, a similar leap in accuracy was not made possible before the invention of the balance spring.  Before these improvements, the equation of time, the difference between apparent and mean solar time, was not even noticed.

During the 17th and 18th centuries, private ownership of clocks and watches became more common, as their improved manufacture made them available for purchase by at least the bourgeoisie of the cities.  Their proliferation had many social and even religious consequences for those who could afford and use them.

Before time became standardized, clock masters used "True Time". The day work began and ended with the sun. This time period was divided into 12 equal hours. This meant that these hours would vary with the seasons, as the length of daylight changed. Each town would have their own variance of this "True Time". Eventually, cities adopted "Mean Time", which is how we think of time nowadays. Astronomers used the Earth's rotation and the stars to calculate the time, and divided the day into 24 uniform and equal hours. Geneva was the first city to adopt mean time in 1780, followed by London in 1792, Berlin in 1810, Paris in 1816, and Vienna in 1823.

Religious consequences
Religious texts of the period make many more references to the irreversible passage of time, and artistic themes appeared at this time such as Vanitas, a reminder of death in the form of a still life, which always included a watch, clock, or some other timepiece.  The relentless ticking of a clock or watch, and the slow but certain movement of its hands, functioned as a visible and audible memento mori.  Clocks and sundials would be decorated with mottos such as ultima forsan ("perhaps the last" [hour]) or vulnerant omnes, ultima necat ("they all wound, and the last kills"). Even today, clocks often carry the motto tempus fugit, "time flies."  Mary, Queen of Scots was said to have owned a large watch made in the shape of a silver skull.

Economic consequences
Economically, their impact was even greater; an awareness that time is money, a limited commodity not to be wasted, also appears during this period.  Because Protestantism was at this time chiefly a religion of literate city dwellers, the so-called "Protestant work ethic" came to be associated with this newly fashioned time discipline. Production of clocks and watches during this period shifted from Italy and Bavaria to Protestant areas such as Geneva, the Netherlands, and England; the names of French clockmakers during this time disclose a large number of commonly Huguenot names from the Old Testament.

Standard, synchronous, public time
Amritesh Singh needed this summary. In the nineteenth century, the introduction of standard time and time zones divorced the "time of day" from local mean solar time and any links to astronomy.  Time signals, like the bells and dials of public clocks, once were relatively local affairs; the ball that is dropped in Times Square on New Year's Eve in New York City once served as a time signal whose original purpose was for navigators to check their marine chronometers.  However, when the railroads began running trains on complex schedules, keeping a schedule that could be followed over distances of hundreds of miles required synchronization on a scale not attempted before.  Telegraphy and later shortwave radio were used to broadcast time signals from the most accurate clocks available.  Radio and television broadcasting schedules created a further impetus to regiment everyone's clock so that they all told the same time within a very small tolerance; the broadcasting of time announcements over radio and television enabled all the households in their audience to get in synch with the clocks at the network.

The mass production of clocks and watches further tightened time discipline in the Western world; before these machines were made, and made to be more accurate, it would be pointless to complain about someone's being fifteen, or five, minutes late.  For many employees, the time clock was the clock that told the time that mattered: it was the clock that recorded their hours of work.  By the time that time clocks became commonplace, public, synchronized clock time was considered a fact of life.  Uniform, synchronized, public clock time did not exist until the nineteenth century.

When one speaks about the intellectual history of time, one essentially is stating that changes have occurred in the way humans experience and measure time. Our conceived abstract notions of time have presumably developed in accordance with our art, our science, and our social infrastructure. (See also horology.)

Towards time-keeping 

The units of time first developed by humans would likely have been days and months (moons).  In some parts of the world the cycle of seasons is apparent enough to lead to people speaking about years and seasons (e.g. 4 summers ago, or 4 floods ago). With the invention of agriculture in the 3rd millennium BC, people relied heavily on the cycle of the seasons for planting and harvesting crops. Most humans came to live in settled societies and the whole community relied upon accurate predictions of the seasonal cycle. This led to the development of calendars.  Over time, some people came to recognize patterns of the stars with the seasons. Learning astronomy became an assigned duty for certain people so they could coordinate the lunar and solar calendars by adding days or months to the year.

At about the same time, sundials were developed, likely marked first at noon, sunrise and sunset.  In ancient Sumer and Egypt, numbers were soon used to divide the day into 12 hours; the night was similarly divided. In Egypt there is not as much seasonal variation in the length of the day, but those further from the equator would need to make many more modifications in calibrating their sundials to deal with these differences. Ancient traditions did not begin the day at midnight, some starting at dawn instead, others at dusk (both being more obvious).

Since a sundial has only one "hand," a minute probably only meant "a short time." It took centuries for technology to make measurements precise enough for minutes (and later seconds) to become fixed meaningful units—longer still for milliseconds, nanoseconds, and further subdivisions.

When the water clock was invented, time could also be measured at night—though there was significant variation in flow rate and less accuracy and precision. With water clocks, and also candle clocks, modifications were made to have them make sounds on a regular basis.

With the invention of the hourglass (perhaps as early as the 11th century), hours and units of time smaller than an hour could be measured much more reliably than with water clocks and candle clocks.

The earliest reasonably accurate mechanical clocks are the 13th century tower clocks probably developed for (and perhaps by) monks in Northern Italy. Using gears and gradually falling weights, these were adjusted to conform with canonical hours—which varied with the length of the day. As these were used primarily to ring bells for prayer, the clock dial likely only came later. When dials were eventually incorporated into clocks, they were analogous to the dials on sundials, and, like a sundial, the clocks themselves had only one hand.

A possible explanation for the shift from having the first hour being the one after dawn, to having the hour after noon being designated as 1 pm (post meridiem), is that these clocks would likely regularly be reset at local high noon each day. This, of course, results in midnight becoming 12 o'clock.

Peter Henlein, a locksmith and burgher of Nuremberg, Germany, invented a spring-powered clock around 1510. It had only one hand, had no glass cover, and was rather imprecise because it slowed down as the spring unwound.  In fact, Henlein went so far as to develop the first portable watch; it was six inches high.  People usually carried it by hand, or wore it around their necks or in large pockets.  The first reported person to actually wear a watch on the wrist was the French mathematician and philosopher, Blaise Pascal (1623–1662). He attached his pocket watch to his wrist with a piece of string.

In 1577, the minute hand was added by a Swiss clock maker, Jost Burgi (who also is a contender for the invention of logarithms), and was incorporated into a clock Burgi made for astronomer Tycho Brahe, who had a need for more accuracy as he charted the heavens.

Isochronous time 

With invention of the pendulum clock in 1656 by Christiaan Huygens, came isochronous time, with a fixed pace of 3600 seconds per hour. By 1680, both a minute hand and then a second hand were added. Some of the first of these had a separate dial for the minute hand (turning counter-clockwise), and a second hand that took 5 minutes per cycle. Even as late as 1773, towns were content to order clocks without minute hands.

But the clocks were still aligned with the local noonday sun. Following the invention of the locomotive in 1830, time had to be synchronized across vast distances in order to organize the train schedules.  This eventually led to the development of time zones, and, thus, global isochronous time.  These time changes were not accepted everywhere right away, because many people's lives were still tied closely to the length of the daytime.  With the invention in 1879 of the light bulb, that changed too.

The isochronous clock changed lives. Appointments are rarely "within the hour," but at quarter hours (and being five minutes late is often considered being tardy). People often eat, drink, sleep, and even go to the bathroom in adherence to some time-dependent schedule.

See also
 12-hour clock
 Punctuality
 Timeline of historic inventions
 Timeline of time measurement technology

References

Further reading
The Discoverers – Daniel J. Boorstin
Theory Out of Bounds – Isabelle Stengers/Ilya Prigogine
Order out of Chaos – Ilya Prigogine
Multifractals and 1/f noise – Benoît Mandelbrot
Conversations on Science, Culture, and Time ( Studies in Literature and Science) – Michel Serres; et al.
The Structure of Scientific Revolutions – Thomas S. Kuhn
Technics and Civilization – Lewis Mumford
Landes, David: Revolution in Time: Clocks and the Making of the Modern World: (Belknap/Harvard, 1983) 
Aveni, Anthony: Empires of Time: Calendars, Clocks, and Cultures: (Basic Books, 1989) 
Thompson, EP: Time, work-discipline and industrial capitalism.  Past & Present 38(1), 56–97 (1967)

External links
 24-hour analog clocks
 1773 town in Scotland orders clock without minute hand
 Quotes About Time Passing
 Huygens' clocks
 Early Clock Face with separate minute dial
 BBC article on shortest time ever measured (10−16 seconds) as of 2004.
Upside Down and Backwards: Time Discipline in a Canadian Inuit Town by Pamela Stern of the University of Waterloo.

Horology
Anthropology
Timekeeping
Sociological terminology